On 12 May 2022, Deborah Samuel Yakubu, a second-year Christian college student, was killed by a mob of Muslim students in Sokoto, Nigeria, after being accused of blasphemy.

Background 

Nigeria is evenly divided into a largely Muslim north and a Christian south. Twelve of Nigeria's thirty-six states have Sunni Islam as the predominant religion, and operate Sharia courts as well as secular customary courts. Sharia courts may treat blasphemy as deserving of several punishments up to, and including, execution.

Vigilantism and extrajudicial killings sometimes occur after accusations of blasphemy.

Lynching 
Deborah Samuel Yakubu, a Christian, was accused of posting a blasphemous statement against the Islamic prophet Muhammad. She allegedly made a comment on WhatsApp, criticizing the religion-related posts that Muslim classmates discussed in the study group she believed should have been reserved for academic purposes.

On 12 May 2022, Yakubu was forcibly taken from the security room she was hidden in at the Shehu Shagari College of Education in Sokoto. A cab had been waiting outside the school to escort her to safety at the police station. Within the college premises, a mob of fellow students stoned Yakubu, before dumping tires on her and burning her body beyond recognition. According to witnesses, security forces fired tear gas and warning shots but failed to disperse the mob. A student who had witnessed the lynching recounted that Yakubu's last words were "What do you hope to achieve with this?", and that Christian students fled the premises during the lynching. A video of the murder circulated on social media.

Aftermath 
Governor Aminu Tambuwal ordered the indefinite closure of the college immediately after the incident, and opened an investigation.

Two students identified from the video were arrested in connection with the lynching.

Following the lynching there was violence against other Christian sites, according to a statement released by the Catholic Diocese of Sokoto. "During the protest, groups of youths led by some adults in the background attacked the Holy Family Catholic Cathedral at Bello Way, destroying church glass windows, those of the Bishop Lawton Secretariat, and vandalized a community bus parked within the premises. St. Kevin’s Catholic Church was also attacked and partly burnt; windows of the new hospital complex under construction, in the same premises, were shattered. The hoodlums also attacked the Bakhita Centre […], burning down a bus within the premises.”

Reactions 
President Muhammadu Buhari condemned the murder, saying: “Muslims all over the world demand respect for the Holy Prophets, including Isah (Alaihissalaam, Jesus Christ) and Muhammad (SAW) but where transgressions occur, as alleged to be the case in this instance, the law does not allow anyone to take matters into their hands." He extended his condolences to Yakubu's family and commended the state's government's prompt response and investigation. Presidential opposition candidate Atiku Abubakar was heavily criticized for taking down social media posts condemning the killing after receiving backlash from Muslim supporters.

Religious leaders throughout the country as well as leaders of the Christian Association of Nigeria called for the swift prosecution of Yakubu's killers. Sultan of Sokoto Sa’adu Abubakar III and the Sokoto Sultanate Council also condemned the "unfortunate happenings" and urged security agencies to bring the offenders to justice. British High Commissioner to Nigeria Catriona Laing condemned the killing and urged that the authorities "ensure the perpetrators of this horrific act are made to face justice in line with the law." International Catholic charity Aid to the Church in Need also criticised the murder, with executive president Thomas Heine-Geldern saying "The levels of extremism and violence reached in Nigeria over the last few years are absolutely appalling. Hardly a week goes by without news of kidnappings and dozens of deaths, but this barbaric act leaves us speechless”.

References 

2022 deaths
2022 murders in Nigeria

Crime in Sokoto State
Filmed killings
Incidents of violence against women
Lynching deaths
May 2022 crimes in Africa
May 2022 events in Nigeria
Persecution of Christians by Muslims
Religiously motivated violence in Nigeria
Sokoto
Violence against women in Nigeria